Espungabera is a township in the Mossurize District of Manica Province in central Mozambique. Espungabera has 3 fuel stations but supplies can run out. The language spoken on either side of the border is chiNdau.  

During the Frelimo-Renamo struggle of the late 70s to early 90s it was one of the strategic towns where the FPLM maintained a heavy mechanized presence, since the Espungabera-Dombé-Chimoio road link which offered access to Zimbabwe, was repeatedly attacked and disrupted by insurgents. In 2010 the Espungabera-Dombé road was being rehabilitated, which was expected to improve the area's economic and tourism potential.

The Pafuri border post with South Africa can be reached via Chitobe (in Machaze District) and Save Centro to Massangena or Zambaredja, but an off-road vehicle is required.

References

Populated places in Manica Province